The Roman Catholic Metropolitan Archdiocese of Tokyo is an ecclesiastical territory or diocese of the Roman Catholic Church in Japan. It was erected as the Apostolic Vicariate of Japan on May 1, 1846, by Pope Gregory XVI, and its name was later changed by Pope Pius IX to the Apostolic Vicariate of Northern Japan on May 22, 1876.

It was elevated to the Metropolitan Archdiocese of Tokyo by Pope Leo XIII on June 15, 1891, with the suffragan sees of Niigata, Saitama, Sapporo, Sendai, and Yokohama.

Tarcisio Isao Kikuchi, S.V.D., previously serving as Bishop of the Roman Catholic Diocese of Niigata, was appointed Archbishop of the Tokyo Archdiocese on October 25, 2017.

History
The Evangelization of Japan starts in 1549 with the arrival of Saint Francis Xavier and goes on until 1587 when Toyotomi Hideyoshi issued the edict forbidding Christianity and ordering all missionaries to leave Japan.  In the following years of persecution, also in Edo (now Tokyo), there were cases of martyrdom in 1612 and 1623.

After the “seclusion period”, the first missionaries of the Paris Foreign Missions Society arrived in Japan in 1858 and were stationed in the three ports of Nagasaki, Yokohama and Hakodate.

On 1 May 1846, Vicariate Apostolic of Japan was erected.

On 22 May 1876, the vicariate apostolic was divided in two: the Apostolic Vicariate of Southern Japan with its center in Nagasaki and Apostolic Vicariate of Northern Japan with its center in Tokyo.  Pierre Marie Osouf was the first Ordinary (Catholic Church) of the Apostolic Vicariate of Northern Japan.

On April 17, 1891. the Vicariate Apostolic of Northern Japan was divided into the Archdiocese of Tokyo and the Diocese of Hakodate. Pierre Marie Osouf became the first Archbishop of Tokyo.

On August 13, 1912, the Archdiocese of Tokyo ceded the prefectures of Toyama, Fukui and Ishikawa to the newly established Prefecture Apostolic of Niigata, and on February 18, 1922, the prefectures of Aichi and Gifu were ceded to the newly established Prefecture Apostolic of Nagoya.

In November 1937, Tokyo was entrusted to the Japanese clergy and confined to Tokyo-to and the Chiba Prefecture. The remaining territory was detached to form the Diocese of Yokohama.  The first Archbishop selected from among the Japanese clergy was Archbishop Peter Tatsu Doi.

List of ordinaries
Théodore-Augustin Forcade, MEP (1846 - 1852)
C. Collin ( 1852 - ?)
Bernard-Thadée Petitjean, MEP (1866 - 1876)
Pierre-Marie Osouf, MEP (1876 - 1906)
Pierre-Xavier Mugabure, MEP (1906 - 1910)
François Bonne, MEP (1910 - 1912)
Jean-Pierre Rey, MEP (1912 - 1926)
Jean-Baptiste-Alexis Chambon, MEP (1927 - 1937)
(Cardinal) Peter Tatsuo Doi (1937 - 1970)
(Cardinal) Peter Seiichi Shirayanagi (1970 - 2000)
Peter Takeo Okada (2000 - 2017)
Tarcisio Isao Kikuchi (2017–present)

See also
Roman Catholicism in Japan

References

External links
Official site
Catholic Bishops' Conference of Japan
Catholic-Hierarchy
GCatholic.org

Christianity in Tokyo
Tokyo
Tokyo
Tokyo
1846 establishments in Japan